Rwanda sent a delegation to compete at the 2008 Summer Paralympics in Beijing. The country was represented by a single athlete. Jean de Dieu Nkundabera, who won a bronze medal in the 2004 Summer Paralympics in Athens, competed in the 800 metre wheelchair sprint.

Athletics

Men

See also
2008 Summer Paralympics
Rwanda at the Paralympics
Rwanda at the 2008 Summer Olympics

References

External links
Beijing 2008 Paralympic Games Official Site
International Paralympic Committee

Nations at the 2008 Summer Paralympics
2008
Paralympics